The Bengal Chess Association (BCA) is the apex body for the game of chess in West Bengal, India. It was formed on 2012 after the West Bengal Chess Association was dissolved. It is affiliated to the All India Chess Federation.

History
The erstwhile West Bengal Ad Hoc Committee, was given an elected form on 3 January 2012 where Sanjoy Sureka was elected president.

The state body, West Bengal Chess Association was dissolved, as it failed to implement the Calcutta High Court's order, given on July 6, 1993 to conduct election within two weeks. Dibyendu Barua, the election officer and the Vice-President of the AICF, held the elections and elected the members of the organisation.

Affiliates
The BCA has a number of affiliated districts bodies, academies and clubs under it.

Affiliated Chess Associations

Affiliated Academies and Clubs
Alekhine Chess Club
Dibyendu Barua Chess Academy
Bengal Chess Wizard
Calcutta Chess Academy
Calcutta Chess Club
Behala Chess Club
Lake Town Cultural Organization
Sealdah Sports & Cultural Organization
Gariahat Chess Club
City Chess Forum
Pioneer chess school

Events
The BCA has been able to organize some notable events in the state.

It organizes the State Selection trials for the National Challengers Chess Tournament every year along with the different age-group tournaments for selecting players for various National Championships.

See also 
 All India Chess Federation

References

External links
Official Website of BCA

Chess organizations
Chess in India
Sports organizations established in 2012
2012 establishments in West Bengal
Sport in West Bengal
Organisations based in West Bengal